TP Vision (TP standing for TPV Philips) is a wholly owned subsidiary of TPV Technology, based in Amsterdam, Netherlands. It develops, manufactures and markets Philips branded TV sets and Philips Professional Displays and LEDwalls in Europe, Russia, the Middle East, Brazil, Argentina, Uruguay, Paraguay, Mexico, Peru, Chile and selected countries in Asia-Pacific, serving both the consumer and hospitality markets.

History
In 2011, Philips announced its intention to sell a majority stake in its HDTV business to TPV Technology.

In April 2012, all 3300 employees of Philips' TV division were transferred to TP Vision, a joint venture 70% owned by TPV Technology, headquartered in Hong Kong, China and 30% by Royal Philips Electronics. Philips also receives royalties from TP Vision.

In January 2014 Philips transferred the remaining 30% equity interest.

Privacy

Netherlands 
In 2012, Philips and TP Vision made statements about their monitoring the use of Philips branded smart TVs in the Netherlands, such as "60% of our active users switch on their television more than 50 times a month".

The Dutch Data Protection Authority (nl) started an investigation into TP Visions collection and handling of usage data in 2012, and in 2013 reported these are not conforming to law in the Netherlands. Through the use of cookies and logfiles, TP Vision was found to be able to monitor when a Philips smart TV is switched on, which programmes are being watched, which websites are being visited and which apps are being used, without clearly informing their customers and asking their prior permission.

In response, TP Vision stated it would change its practices to conform to the law.

Notes and references

External links

Philips
Electronics companies established in 2012
Manufacturing companies established in 2012
Dutch companies established in 2012